The 2015 World Rowing Championships were World Rowing Championships that were held from 30 August to 6 September 2015 at Lac d'Aiguebelette, Aiguebelette in France.

Description
The annual week-long rowing regatta was organized by FISA (the International Rowing Federation). In non-Olympic years the regatta is the highlight of the international rowing calendar, and as 2015 was a pre-Olympic year, the championships were also the main qualification event for the following year's Olympics and Paralympics.

For the first time, Rowing New Zealand started in all (14) Olympic boat classes.

Medal summary

Medal table

Men's events
 Non-Olympic classes

Women's events
 Non-Olympic classes

Para-rowing (adaptive) events

Event codes

References

External links

 Official website
 Official results 

World Rowing Championships
World Rowing Championships
World Rowing Championships
2015 World Rowing Championships
World
World Rowing Championships
World Rowing Championships